The anterior boundary of the sella turcica is completed by two small eminences, one on either side, called the middle clinoid processes. It is found lateral to the sella turcica.

Etymology

Clinoid likely comes from the Greek root klinein or the Latin clinare, both meaning "sloped" as in "inclined."

References 

Bones of the head and neck